Ferdinand Bordewijk (10 October 1884 – 28 April 1965) was a Dutch author. His style, which is terse and symbolic, is considered to belong to New Objectivity and magic realism. He was awarded the P. C. Hooft Award in 1953 and the Constantijn Huygens Prize in 1957. Character (1997), an Academy Award-winning film directed by Mike van Diem, was based on his novel of the same name (1938).

Biography
Ferdinand Bordewijk was born in Amsterdam, Netherlands, and moved to The Hague when he was ten years old. He studied law at Leiden University. After graduation, he worked first at a Rotterdam law firm and became an independent lawyer in Schiedam in 1919, remaining an inhabitant of The Hague all of his life. He was married to the composer Johanna Bordewijk-Roepman. He wrote the libretto for her opera Rotonde (1941).

Works
His first published work was a volume of poetry titled  (Mushrooms) under the pseudonym Ton Ven. It was not particularly well received.

It is comparable to Aldous Huxley's Brave New World, which appeared one year later and which Bordewijk deemed to be junk ("").

Bibliography

1916 –  (under the pseudonym Ton Ven)
1918 –  (A king of the phrase) in: Groot Nederland
1919 –  (Fantastic tales), short stories
1923 –  (Fantastic tales II), short stories
1924 –  (Fantastic tales III), short stories
1931 –  (Cubes), novel
1933 –  (novel)
1934 –  (novel)
1935 –  (The last honor, eulogy)
1935 – 
1936 –  (Red palace, downfall of the century)
1936 – 
1937 –  (short stories)
1938 –  (novel); English translation: Character, from Dutch by E. M. Prince; London, Peter Owen, 1966, etc. Filmed as 1997 Dutch/Belgian film, directed by Mike van Diem.
1940 – 
1940 –  (Three plays)
1941 – Apollyon
1946 –  (Oaks of Dodona)
1946 – 
1947 –  (By gaslight)
1947 –  (Five fantastic tales)
1948 – 
1948 –  (Plato's death, symphonic poem)
1948 –  (opera)
1949 – , Bint (Cubes, grunting animals, Bint), compilation
1949 – 
1949 – 
1949 – 
1950 –  (Tales from the other side)
1951 – 
1951 – 
1952 – 
1954 – 
1954 –  (Misses and mister Richebois; twenty short stories)
1955 –  (compendium)
1955 – 
1955 – 
1956 – 
1956 –  (play)
1956 –  (Ten stories)
1957 –  (Idem; ten parodies)
1958 – 
1959 –  (The gypsies; twelve short stories and a sketch)
1960 –  (Centre of silence; five stories)
1961 –  (Faraway tidings)
1961 –  (under the pseudonym Ton Ven)
1964 –  (Spring, seven stories)
1964 –  (under the pseudonym Ton Ven)
1965 – 
1981 – 
1982 –  (Seven fantastic tales)
1982–1991 –  (Complete works, thirteen parts)
1983 –  (Five little stories)

References

 Augustinus P. Dierick: "Aspects of Myth in Ferdinand Bordewijk's Karakter. In: The Low Countries: Multidisciplinary Studies (ed. Margriet Bruijn Lacy).  Lanham, New York, London: University Press of America, 1990, 147-155.

See also
Ferdinand Bordewijk Prize

Dutch male novelists
1884 births
1965 deaths
Writers from Amsterdam
Constantijn Huygens Prize winners
P. C. Hooft Award winners
Articles containing video clips
20th-century Dutch novelists
20th-century Dutch male writers